, provisional designation: , is a sub-kilometer near-Earth object of the Amor group, approximately  in diameter. The S-type asteroid has been identified as a potential flyby target of the Hayabusa2 mission. It was discovered on 17 November 2001, by astronomers with the Lincoln Near-Earth Asteroid Research at the Lincoln Laboratory's Experimental Test Site near Socorro, New Mexico, in the United States. The asteroid has a rotation period of 8.0 hours and possibly an elongated shape. It remains unnamed since its numbering in December 2007.

Orbit and classification 

 is an Amor asteroid – a subgroup of near-Earth asteroids that approach the orbit of Earth from beyond, but do not cross it. The object orbits the Sun at a distance of 1.02–1.54 AU once every 17 months (527 days; semi-major axis of 1.28 AU). Its orbit has an eccentricity of 0.20 and an inclination of 25° with respect to the ecliptic. The body's observation arc begins with its first observation in February 1953, more than 48 years prior to its official discovery observation at Socorro. The precovery was taken at Palomar Observatory and published by the Digitized Sky Survey.

Close encounters 

Hayabusa2 mission 

 was proposed as a target of the Hayabusa2 extended mission for a flyby planned to occur on 27 June 2023. When the spacecraft returns to Earth and delivers the sample capsule in December 2020, it is expected to retain 30 kg of xenon propellant, which can be used to extend its service and flyby new targets to explore.

Numbering and naming 

This minor planet was numbered by the Minor Planet Center on 24 December 2007. , it has not been named.

Physical characteristics 

 has been characterized as a common, stony S-type asteroid.

Rotation period 

Lightcurve analysis gave a rotation period of  hours with a brightness amplitude of 0.95 magnitude, indicative of a non-spherical shape.

Diameter and albedo 

According to the survey carried out by the NEOWISE mission of NASA's Wide-field Infrared Survey Explorer,  has an albedo of 0.34 and measures 0.63 and 0.66 kilometers in diameter, respectively. The Collaborative Asteroid Lightcurve Link assumes a standard albedo for a stony asteroid of 0.20 and calculates a diameter of 0.818 kilometers based on an absolute magnitude of 17.8.

Notes

References

External links 
 List Of Amor Minor Planets (by designation), Minor Planet Center
 Asteroid Lightcurve Database (LCDB), query form (simple version)
 
 
 

172034
172034
172034
20011117